Bombali is a district in the  Northern Province of Sierra Leone. Its capital and largest city is Makeni, which is also the largest city in the north. The Bombali district is one of the sixteen districts of Sierra Leone. Bombali is one of the largest districts in Sierra Leone by geographical area, after Koinadugu district, and is the second most populous district in the Northern part of Sierra Leone, after Port Loko district. In the 2015 Sierra Leone national census, the population of Bombali district was 606,183.  Other major towns in Bombali District include Kamabai, Karina and Binkolo.

The district borders Karene District to the north, Port Loko District, Tonkolili District to the south, and Koinadugu District to the east.

The population of Bombali District is ethnically diverse, although the Temne and Limba form the largest ethnic groups. The population of Bombali District is predominantly Muslim, though with a large Christian minority.

Bombali district is the birthplace and home district of the former president of Sierra Leone, Ernest Bai Koroma, who was born and raised in the city of Makeni. The district is also the birthplace and home district of former president of Sierra Leone Joseph Saidu Momoh, who was born in the town of Binkolo.

The University of Makeni and St. Francis Secondary school are based in Bombali District's largest city, Makeni.

Government and politics
Bombali district is governed with a directly elected district council form of government, which is headed by a district council chairman, who is the highest local government official in the district. The chairman is responsible for the general management of the district. The current chairman is John Shangai Koruna of the All People's Congress (APC), following his victory in the 2018 Sierra Leone general elections.

Bombali district is a political stronghold of the APC, the current ruling party in Sierra Leone; and one of the two major political parties in the country. Currently the APC holds all elected seats from Bombali district to the Parliament of Sierra Leone. The APC also controls the Bombali District Council local government and the Makeni city council. Two of the three Sierra Leone presidents from the APC party Joseph Saidu Momoh and Ernest Bai Koroma are natives of Bombali district.

The APC has always been overwhelmingly popular in almost all parts of Bombali district since the party was founded; with the exception of the predominantly ethnic Mandingo town of Karina and its surrounding villages, located in part of Biriwa Chiefdom, which have traditionally supported the Sierra Leone People's Party (SLPP), particularly under the government of president Ahmad Tejan Kabbah, who was overwhelmingly popular in Karina and its surrounding villages during his presidency.

Members of Parliament
The district of Bombali has eight Representatives in the Sierra Leonean Parliament, of which seven members were elected for a five-year term. The district is a stronghold of the former ruling government of the APC party. In the second round of the 2007 Sierra Leone presidential election, the incumbent vice president of Sierra Leone Solomon Berewa and candidate of the then ruling SLPP got 11 percent of the vote in Bombali District, while the leader of the main opposition party and current president of Sierra Leone Ernest Bai Koroma of the All People's Congress (APC) got 89 percent in the second round in the district.

Administrative divisions

Chiefdoms
The district is made up of thirteen chiefdoms as the third level of administrative subdivision.

Biriwa – Kamabai
Bombali Shebora – Makeni
Gbanti Kamaranka – Kamaranka
Gbendembu Ngowahun – Kalangba
Libeisaygahun – Batkanu
Magbaiamba Ndowahun – Hunduwa
Makari Gbanti – Masongbon
Paki Massabong – Mapaki
Safroko Limba – Binkolo
Sanda Loko – Kamalo
Sanda Tenraren – Mateboi
Sella Limba – Kamakwie
Tambakha – Fintonia

Major towns

Makeni, largest city
Kamakwie
Kamabai
Karina
Binkolo

Towns and villages

Masongbon
Kagber
Kalangba
Kangbori
Fintonia
Lowoma
Hunduwa
Kamaranka
Batkanu
Mateboi
Gbendembu
Tambiama
Masingbi
Mapaki
Moriba
Rokulan
Kamalo
Sanda
Tonko

Effects of the civil war 

Bombali was a principal former rebel stronghold and experienced considerable displacement, destruction and trauma as a result of the conflict. While progress has been made since the conflict, particularly in restoration of state authority, the level of social services and economic recovery remains unsatisfactory throughout the district. The provincial importance of Makeni is in contrast with the current lack of water and power supply in the township, and the bad road network and large distances in the district have meant that limited intervention has been made in chiefdoms outside of the Makeni area, particularly in the far north.

Health 

Medical services are provided by a mix of government, private and non-governmental organizations (NGOs). The Ministry of Health and Sanitation (MOHS) shifted to a decentralized health system structure after the end of the civil in war in 2002, in an effort to increase coverage. Bombali has 16 community health centers (CHC), 18 community health posts (CHP), 48 maternal child health posts (MCHP), 1 government hospital, 1 military hospital, 1 community hospital, 3 mission Clinics, 3 mission hospitals and 3 private clinics. Traditional medicine forms part of the primary health care system in Sierra Leone. Diseases endemic to Bombali are Yellow Fever and Malaria. Holy Spirit Hospital (Makeni), largest private hospital in the Northern Province of Sierra Leone, is located in Bombali District in the town of Makeni.

In 2019, the First Responder Coalition of Sierra Leone (FRCSL) was created in Makeni, the largest city of Bombali District. The five founding members included the Sierra Leone Red Cross Society, LFR International, the University of Makeni, Agency for Rural Community Transformation, and Holy Spirit Hospital. 1,000 community members from Bombali were trained to be first responders by the Coalition and equipped with first aid kits between June and July 2019.

Religion

Notable people
Ernest Bai Koroma, President of Sierra Leone from 2007 to 2018
Joseph Saidu Momoh, President of Sierra Leone from 1985 to 1992
Almamy Suluku, was a powerful Limba ruler who maintained his independence as long as possible through brilliant political strategy during colonial era.
Edward Turay, Politician
Brima Koroma, football star
Mohamed Kamara, football star
Daddi Cool, Guinean reggae musician

See also
Sierra Leone
Sierra Leone Civil War

Notes

Sources 
Parts of this article reproduced with permission from 
https://web.archive.org/web/20070121122533/http://www.statehouse-sl.org/member-parliament.html

Districts of Sierra Leone
Northern Province, Sierra Leone